Donegal Township is a township in Washington County, Pennsylvania, United States. The population was 2,389 at the 2020 census.

It was named after the town and county of Donegal in Ireland. At the 2000 census, 13.7% of the population were reported to be Scotch-Irish (Ulster Scots), the highest number in the United States.

History
The Margaret Derrow House, Blaney Mays Covered Bridge and West Alexander Historic District are listed on the National Register of Historic Places.

Geography

Demographics

As of the census of 2000, there were 2,428 people, 945 households, and 721 families living in the township.  The population density was 58.7 people per square mile (22.7/km2).  There were 996 housing units at an average density of 24.1/sq mi (9.3/km2).  The racial makeup of the township was 99.22% White, 0.08% African American, 0.08% Native American, 0.08% Asian, 0.08% Pacific Islander, and 0.45% from two or more races. Hispanic or Latino people of any race were 0.12% of the population.

There were 945 households, out of which 32.5% had children under the age of 18 living with them, 63.3% were married couples living together, 9.5% had a female householder with no husband present, and 23.7% were non-families. 21.8% of all households were made up of individuals, and 10.4% had someone living alone who was 65 years of age or older.  The average household size was 2.55 and the average family size was 2.97.

In the township the population was spread out, with 24.2% under the age of 18, 6.3% from 18 to 24, 27.8% from 25 to 44, 27.3% from 45 to 64, and 14.3% who were 65 years of age or older.  The median age was 40 years. For every 100 females there were 101.2 males.  For every 100 females age 18 and over, there were 93.8 males.

The median income for a household in the township was $38,203, and the median income for a family was $43,839. Males had a median income of $33,750 versus $20,288 for females. The per capita income for the township was $17,288.  About 7.5% of families and 9.0% of the population were below the poverty line, including 13.0% of those under age 18 and 8.1% of those age 65 or over.

References

Scotch-Irish American culture in Pennsylvania
Townships in Washington County, Pennsylvania